Sezer Huysuz (born November 20, 1977, in Ordu) is a Turkish judoka competing in the lightweight (73 kg) division. Currently, he is a member of Istanbul Büyükşehir Belediyespor.  He has competed at two Olympics, reaching the third round at the 2008 Summer Olympics and the second round at the 2012 Summer Olympics.

Achievements

References

1977 births
Sportspeople from Ordu
Living people
Turkish male judoka
Judoka at the 2008 Summer Olympics
Olympic judoka of Turkey
Judoka at the 2012 Summer Olympics
Mediterranean Games silver medalists for Turkey
Mediterranean Games bronze medalists for Turkey
Competitors at the 2005 Mediterranean Games
Competitors at the 2009 Mediterranean Games
Mediterranean Games medalists in judo
21st-century Turkish people